Discotheque Barbarella was a discoteque in Växjö, Sweden, prominent in the 1970s. In a city of very limited entertainment, Barbarella played a central role. The disco opened in 1971 in an industrial area in the outskirts and drew crowds from many parts of southeastern Sweden. It closed in 1992.

Concerts at Barbarella 

The brains behind Barbarella succeeded in attracting many well-known Swedish and international bands of the 1970s to perform in Växjö. Notable concerts are as follows:

Colosseum, 1971
Manfred Mann's Earth Band, 5 October 1973
John Holm, 31 January 1975
Thin Lizzy, 18 October 1975
AC/DC, 23 July 1976
Sex Pistols, 23–24 July 1977
The Groundhogs
Procol Harum
Status Quo
Doctors of Madness
Sweet
John Cale
Eric Burdon of The Animals 
Savage Rose
Pugh Rogefeldt
Hoola Bandoola Band 
Tasavallan presidentti
Ekseption
Gasolin
The Troggs
Ian Hunter of Mott the Hoople

References

External links
smp.se 
acc.umu.se
Thin Lizzy dates
Manfred Manns turnélista

Nightclubs in Sweden
1971 establishments in Sweden
1992 disestablishments in Sweden
Buildings and structures in Växjö
Music venues completed in 1971